"How Do You Like It?" is a 1994 song by the American R&B artist Keith Sweat from the album, Get Up on It, and features Lisa "Left Eye" Lopes of TLC. The song peaked at number 48 on the Billboard Hot 100 chart and number nine on the R&B Singles chart in the US, and 71 on the British charts.

The song makes up the first two tracks on the album Get Up on It, first as an interlude, then as the full-length song.

Charts

References

1994 singles
Keith Sweat songs
1994 songs
Songs written by Keith Sweat
Songs written by Lisa Lopes
Elektra Records singles